The Checheț is a left tributary of the river Ier in Romania. It flows into the Ier near Căuaș.

References

Rivers of Romania
Rivers of Satu Mare County